Leonard Cohen was a Canadian singer-songwriter and poet who was active in music from 1967 until his death in 2016. Cohen released 14 studio albums and eight live albums during the course of a recording career lasting almost 50 years, throughout which he remained an active poet. His entire catalogue is available on Columbia Records. His 1967 debut Songs of Leonard Cohen earned an RIAA gold record; he followed up with three more highly acclaimed albums: Songs from a Room (1969), Songs of Love and Hate (1971) and New Skin for the Old Ceremony (1974), before allowing Phil Spector to produce Death of a Ladies' Man for Warner Bros. Records in 1977. Cohen returned to Columbia in 1979 for Recent Songs, but the label declined to release his next album, Various Positions (1984) in the US, leaving it to American shops to import it from CBS Canada. In 1988, Columbia got behind Cohen again and gave full support to I'm Your Man, which brought his career to new heights, and Cohen followed it with 1992's The Future. 

Cohen then took a nine-year hiatus, and returned with Ten New Songs in 2001, which he made with Sharon Robinson, following this with Dear Heather (2004). In 2008 Cohen began touring for the first time in 15 years and, as well as the release of several live albums, he released Old Ideas (2012), which peaked at number three on the Billboard 200 albums chart. This was the highest ranking ever for a Leonard Cohen album, and it became his first to top the Canadian Albums Chart, a feat he repeated with his follow-up, Popular Problems, released in 2014. Cohen released his final studio album, You Want It Darker, in October 2016, only 19 days prior to his death. A posthumous album titled Thanks for the Dance was released on November 22, 2019. 

His live albums included Live Songs (1973), Cohen Live: Leonard Cohen in Concert (1994), Live in London (2009), Songs from the Road (2010), from his 2008–2009 world tour, and Live at the Isle of Wight 1970 (2009).

Albums

Studio albums

Live albums

Compilation albums 

Notes
A  The Best of Leonard Cohen, or Greatest Hits as it was released in Europe, did not chart in the Netherlands and UK when it was released in 1975, but the album did chart when re-issued on CD in 1988–1989. In UK it initially reached a peak at number 99 in 1988 and then at 88 in 1995. In Netherlands it reached number 86 in April 1989.
B  The Essential Leonard Cohen was re-released in 2008 as The Essential Leonard Cohen 3.0, a 3-disc edition which charted in Australia in February 2009.
C  The Essential Leonard Cohen initially peaked at number 70 in 2003. The album re-entered the charts in 2008 at number 57, before peaking at number 26 after Cohen's death in November 2016.

Singles and EPs 

Notes
D  Leonard Cohen's 1984 track "Hallelujah" charted in Sweden in December 2007 due to download sales. At the same time Jeff Buckley's version also entered the charts, and the week of December 13, 2007, Buckley's version peaked at No. 5 with Cohen's original reaching its peak position No. 16 the same week.
E  Although not explicitly released as a single, Cohen's heavily covered 1984 track "Hallelujah" charted in the United Kingdom in December 2008 at position number 36. This was due to downloads of the track as a result of the publicity created by Alexandra Burke's cover version, which charted at No. 1 at the same time, and a campaign to get Jeff Buckley's version into the charts (which it did, peaking at No. 2 simultaneous to Burke's cover).
F  Record Store Day 2009 (April 18, 2009) exclusive release.
G  "Hallelujah" did not chart in the United States until November 2016, after Cohen's death. It also charted on the Hot Rock Songs chart at No. 20.

Contributions

Guest

Spoken word

Alternate mixes and live version compilations

Soundtracks

Film scores with no soundtrack album 
 Beware of a Holy Whore (1971) - Rainer Werner Fassbinder uses five songs.
 Who's He Anyway (1983) - debut short directed by Alfonso Cuarón.
 Other Tongues (1984) - collaboration with Zone Jaune.
 Both Sides of the Wire (1993) - documentary on Canada's role in World War II.
 Kiss the Sky (1995) - director Roger Young uses seven songs.
 Death of a Ladies' Man (2020) - director Matt Bissonnette uses seven songs.

Tribute compilations 
 I'm Your Fan: The Songs Of Leonard Cohen By... 2XLP/CD (Atlantic/Columbia/EastWest/Music on Vinyl) (1991)
 Tower Of Song (The Songs Of Leonard Cohen) (A & M) (1995)
 According To Leonard Cohen (Acordes Con Leonard Cohen) 2XCD + DVD (DiscMedi Blau) (2007)
 Cohen Revisited (A Tribute To Leonard Cohen) (Les Inrockuptibles) (2009)
 The Songs Of Leonard Cohen Covered (Mojo) (2012)
 A Tribute To Leonard Cohen-Songs Of Love And Hate (Les Inrockuptibles) (2014)
 Sincerely, L. Cohen: A Live Celebration Of Leonard Cohen 2XLP (The Royal Potato Family) (2017)
 Hallelujah: Songs Of Leonard Cohen (Ace) (2019)
 Here It Is: A Tribute To Leonard Cohen 2XLP/CD (Blue Note) (2022)
 A Day With Suzanne: A Tribute to Leonard Cohen (Sony) 2022

Videography

Concerts
 1970 Live at the Isle of Wight 1970 (Film; DVD/Blu-ray/Streaming 2009)
 1988 Songs From the Life of Leonard Cohen (TV, VHS, Laserdisc)
 1993 Una nit a Barcelona (TV)
 2005 I'm Your Man (Film; Theatrical/DVD 2006; Blu-ray/Streaming 2017)
 2009 Live in London (DVD/Streaming)
 2010 Songs from the Road (DVD/Blu-ray/Streaming)
 2014 Live in Dublin (DVD/Blu-ray/Streaming)

Films
 1983 I Am a Hotel (TV; VHS 1984, 1996)

Documentaries
 1965 Ladies and Gentlemen... Mr. Leonard Cohen (Film; VHS 1999, 2000; DVD 1999, 2000, 2006; Streaming 2017)
 1974 Bird on a Wire (Film/TV; DVD 2010, 2016; Streaming/Theatrical 2017)
 1980 The Song of Leonard Cohen (TV; Theatrical 1990)
 1997 Spring 96 (TV)
 1997 Beautiful Losers (TV)
 2008 Everybody Knows (TV)
 2010 Leonard Cohen's Lonesome Heroes (DVD/Streaming)
 2019 Marianne & Leonard: Words of Love (Theatrical/DVD/Streaming)
 2021 Hallelujah: Leonard Cohen, A Journey, A Song (Film; Theatrical/DVD/Blu-ray/Streaming 2022)

Music Videos
 1983 Suzanne
 1984 Hallelujah
 1984 Dance Me to the End of Love
 1985 Psycho Rail by Terminal Sunglasses
 1986 Take This Waltz
 1988 I'm Your Man
 1988 First We Take Manhattan
 1992 Democracy
 1992 Closing Time
 1993 The Future
 1995 Dance Me to the End of Love (Short)
 2002 In My Secret Life
 2005 Because Of
 2009 Hallelujah (Live in London)
 2009 Suzanne (Live at The Isle of Wight 1970)
 2009 One of Us Cannot Be Wrong (Live at The Isle of Wight 1970)
 2011 Lover Lover Lover (Short)
 2012 Show Me the Place (Lyric)
 2014 Almost Like the Blues (Lyric)
 2014 Did I Ever Love You (Lyric)
 2014 Come Healing (Live in Dublin)
 2014 Everybody Knows (Live in Dublin)
 2014 So Long, Marianne (Live in Dublin)
 2014 Famous Blue Raincoat (Live in Dublin)
 2014 I'm Your Man (Live in Dublin)
 2017 Traveling Light (Lyric)
 2017 Leaving the Table
 2019 The Goal
 2019 Happens to the Heart
 2020 Thanks for the Dance
 2020 The Hills
 2020 Moving On
 2021 Puppets
 2022 Hallelujah (Live at Glastonbury) (Lyric)

Source:

References 

 
Discographies of Canadian artists
Folk music discographies